The Zimbabwe Institution of Engineers is the professional organization of engineers in Zimbabwe. It has graded membership, including student, technician, graduate and corporate membership as well as the status of fellow.

See also 
 Zimbabwe Institute of Management 
 Zimbabwe Institute of Legal Studies

References

External links
 ZIE web site
 ZIE UK Site

Engineering societies
Engineering organizations